The 2017 Ruslan Simara Gold Cup was the eighth tournament of the Simara Gold Cup, an annual football knockout tournament held in Simara, Nepal. In total, ten teams participated in this tournament.

Sankata FC defeated Nepal Army Club 4-2 on penalties in the final to claim their first title in this tournament.

Teams
Five top Nepali A Level football teams and five top cities football teams participants in this football tournament.

Bracket
The following is the bracket which the 2017 Ruslan Simara Gold Cup resembled. Numbers in parentheses next to the match score represent the results of a penalty shoot-out.

Awards

References

Football competitions in Nepal
2017–18 in Nepalese football